Viatcheslav Borisovich Botchkarev (born 4 June 1968) is a former Soviet sport shooter.

He was born in Frunze, and shares the world record in the 50 meter rifle prone competition.

Current world record in 50 m rifle prone

References

External links
issf bio
sports-reference.com

1968 births
Living people
Sportspeople from Bishkek
Soviet male sport shooters
Russian male sport shooters
Olympic shooters of Russia
Shooters at the 1996 Summer Olympics